Hanshaw is a surname. Notable people with the surname include:

Annette Hanshaw (1901–1985), American jazz singer
Anthony Hanshaw (born 1978), American boxer
Roger Hanshaw (born 1980), American politician

See also 

 Fanshawe (surname)

Surnames
Surnames of English origin
Surnames of British Isles origin
English-language surnames